Umberto Orsini (born 6 December 1994) is an Italian former professional cyclist, who rode professionally for UCI ProTeam  between 2018 and 2020. In May 2019, he was named in the startlist for the 2019 Giro d'Italia.

Major results
2012
 1st  Road race, National Junior Road Championships
 1st Trophée de la Ville de Loano
 3rd Overall Giro della Lunigiana
2016
 8th Piccolo Giro di Lombardia
 8th Coppa Città di Offida
 8th GP Capodarco
 9th Trofeo Piva

Grand Tour general classification results timeline

References

External links

1994 births
Living people
Italian male cyclists
People from Empoli
Sportspeople from the Metropolitan City of Florence
Cyclists from Tuscany
21st-century Italian people